Football Federation Samoa is a member of the Oceania Football Confederation and is the national governing body for association football in Samoa. It was founded in 1968 and became a FIFA member in 1986. The Samoa national football team is a regular entrant into OFC competitions, including FIFA World Cup qualifying.

Championships

Samoa National League 
Football Federation Samoa hosts one league, the Samoa National League. The current champion of the league is Lupe o le Soaga, as of the 2017 season.

Samoa Cup 
Football Federation Samoa also hosts one domestic cup, the Samoa Cup. The current champion of the cup is Kiwi FC, as of the 2014 edition.

External links 
 
 Samoa at FIFA site
 Samoa at OFC site

Samoa
Football in Samoa
Sports organizations established in 1968